George Frank Henry Heane (2 January 1904 – 24 October 1969) was an English cricketer. He was a right-arm medium pace bowler and left-hand batsman. He played first-class matches for Nottinghamshire from 1927 to 1951, captaining the club in some games in 1935 and then regularly between 1936 and 1946, and for Marylebone Cricket Club from 1946 to 1948. He toured New Zealand with Sir Julien Cahn's XI in 1938-39.

References

External links

English cricketers
Nottinghamshire cricketers
Nottinghamshire cricket captains
English people of Irish descent
1904 births
1969 deaths
Marylebone Cricket Club cricketers
Gentlemen cricketers
North v South cricketers
Lincolnshire cricketers
English cricketers of 1919 to 1945
Sir Julien Cahn's XI cricketers
H. D. G. Leveson Gower's XI cricketers
M. Leyland's XI cricketers